= Goose Nest, West Virginia =

Unincorporated community in West Virginia, United States

- Unincorporated community
- Location within West Virginia Location within the United States
- Coordinates: 39°26′45″N 78°04′35″W
- Country: United States
- State: West Virginia
- County: Berkeley
- Elevation: 1,096 ft (334 m)
- Time zone: UTC-5 (Eastern (EST))
  - Summer (DST): UTC-4 (EDT)
- Area codes: 304 & 681
- GNIS feature ID: 1549711

Goose Nest is an unincorporated community in Berkeley County, West Virginia, United States. Goose Nest is 6 miles (9.7 km) west-southwest of Martinsburg.
